Family Plots is an American reality series that followed the ongoing events and employees at the family-run Poway Bernardo Mortuary in Poway, California. It ran for four seasons on the A&E Network.

Overview
The show centered on the relationships between the employees, for instance Chuck Wissmiller and his three daughters – all of whom worked together at the mortuary during the show's run.  Each episode featured one or two funerals with families who shared their grief while celebrating the life and contributions of their loved ones.  The departed themselves were seen from time to time on the show, but care was taken by the crew to portray their memory respectfully.  While the work done in the preparation room was also shown, the more graphic portions of mortuary work were depicted deferentially.

The show was also aired on the Seven Network in Australia, in Canada, and Europe.

See also
 Six Feet Under – an HBO series about a fictional funeral home
 List of reality television programs
 Lloyd M. Bucher – a US Navy commander whose funeral was handled from Poway Bernardo Mortuary, and whose funeral was the focus of an episode on the series

References

External links
 The Poway Bernardo Mortuary web site

A&E (TV network) original programming
2000s American reality television series
2004 American television series debuts
2005 American television series endings
English-language television shows
Television shows about death
Television shows set in San Diego